Aq Tappeh (also Romanized as Āq Tappeh) is a village in Garmkhan Rural District, Garmkhan District, Bojnord County, North Khorasan Province, Iran. At the 2006 census, its population was 600, in 132 families.

References 

Populated places in Bojnord County